Earl Buford Ellington (June 27, 1907 – April 3, 1972) was an American politician who served as the 42nd governor of Tennessee from 1959 to 1963, and again from 1967 to 1971. Along with his political ally, Frank G. Clement, he helped lead a political machine that controlled the governor's office for 18 years, from 1953 to 1971.

Ellington was a supporter of President Lyndon B. Johnson; he was appointed in 1965 as the Director of the Office of Emergency Planning during the Johnson Administration.

Early life and career

Ellington was born in Holmes County, Mississippi, the son of Abner and Cora (Grantham) Ellington.  He studied religion at Millsaps College in Jackson, Mississippi, but had to drop out due to financial difficulties.  He edited a newspaper in Durant, Mississippi, for a brief period.

In 1929, he married Catherine Ann Cheek, and moved to her native Marshall County, Tennessee, in the south central part of the state. There he bought a store in the Verona community.  He worked as a salesman for American Harvester in the 1930s, and was a supervising salesman with Tennessee Farm Bureau Insurance in the early 1940s.

Having joined the Democratic Party, in 1944, Ellington worked in the campaign of successful gubernatorial candidate, Jim Nance McCord.  Two years later, he was the Marshall County manager for the campaign of US Congressman Joe L. Evins.  In 1948, Ellington ran and was elected to Marshall County's seat in the Tennessee House of Representatives.

In 1952, Ellington managed the successful campaign of Frank Clement, who defeated incumbent Gordon Browning in the Democratic primary for governor, and went on to win the general election.  Clement's campaign had the support of Memphis political boss E. H. Crump, who was seeking to regain the influence he had lost after Browning defeated his candidate, McCord, four years earlier.  Clement appointed Ellington as Commissioner of Agriculture, where he served until the late 1950s under more than one administration.

Governor

In 1953, the Tennessee State Constitution was amended, extending the gubernatorial term from two years to four years.  The new amendments prevented governors from serving consecutive terms, but a temporary exception was made for Clement. He was elected to a full four-year term in 1954 after his initial two-year term.

In 1958, with Clement term-limited, Ellington sought the Democratic Party's nomination for governor. His opponents were Memphis mayor Edmund Orgill, Nashville attorney Clifford Allen, and Judge Andrew "Tip" Taylor.  Since Crump's death in 1954, the Clement-Ellington alliance had become the state's leading political organization.  Ellington won the nomination with 213,415 votes to 204,629 for Taylor, 204,382 for Orgill, and 56,854 for Allen.  He won the general election by a sizeable margin over several opponents, among them former Governor McCord, who ran as an independent.

During his first term, Ellington continued many of Clement's policies.  Aided by an economic boom, he could approve raises for public school teachers and school administrators without increasing taxes.  While he supported continued legal segregation, he ordered the state to comply with the U.S. Supreme Court's decision in Brown v. Board of Education (1954) that ruled that segregation in public schools was unconstitutional; it ordered desegregation of the public school system.

In 1961, several Tennessee State University students who had participated in the Freedom Rides, to highlight illegal segregation on interstates buses, which were covered by federal law, were expelled after Ellington ordered an investigation into their activities.  In response, dozens of protesters picketed the state capitol and demanded a meeting with Ellington, but he refused.

At the 1960 Democratic National Convention, a rift had begun to form in the relationship between Clement and Ellington. The former endorsed John F. Kennedy for president, and the latter endorsed Lyndon B. Johnson.

Following his first term as governor, which ended in 1963, Ellington returned to the private sector, working as a vice president of the Louisville and Nashville Railroad. Vice President Lyndon Johnson succeeded Kennedy to the presidency after he was assassinated in Dallas in November 1963.

In early 1965, President Johnson appointed Ellington as Director of the Office of Emergency Planning (later integrated into FEMA). During the Selma to Montgomery marches, which took place at the height of the civil rights movement in March of that year, Ellington played a key role in establishing contact and talks between President Johnson and Governor George Wallace of Alabama. The state provided protection for marchers in the last march.  In September, Ellington helped organize federal relief efforts in the wake of Hurricane Betsy.

Ellington again sought the Democratic Party nomination for governor in 1966. His opponent, John Jay Hooker, was a friend of former Governor Browning, and had been endorsed by the Nashville Tennessean.  Ellington was endorsed by President Johnson, Clement, and the Nashville Banner. He defeated Hooker for the nomination, 413,950 votes to 360,105.  The divide between Clement and Ellington continued to grow, as Ellington refused to endorse Clement in his US Senate primary campaign against Ross Bass. Governor Clement attempted to spend the state's budget surplus to ensure the Ellington administration did not inherit it.

Ellington won the general gubernatorial election in 1966. By this time, he had shifted his position on segregation, and openly supported an end to the long-standing practice.  In 1967, he appointed African American Hosea T. Lockard to his cabinet as administrative assistant; he was the first black cabinet member in state history.  On April 4, 1968, the assassination of Martin Luther King Jr. in Memphis led Ellington to immediately mobilize the National Guard, to prevent rioting in the city.

In September 1967, Ellington signed a bill repealing the Butler Act, the 1925 law that had outlawed the teaching of the Theory of Evolution in state schools.

Later life

Ellington did not seek another office after his second term as governor ended.  In the 1970 gubernatorial campaign, he refused to endorse the Democratic nominee, John Jay Hooker, and quietly supported the Republican nominee (and eventual winner), Winfield Dunn.  Ellington's press secretary, Hudley Crockett, was narrowly defeated by incumbent Al Gore, Sr., in the 1970 U.S. Senate primary.

Ellington died while playing golf in Boca Raton, Florida, on April 3, 1972.  Former President Johnson and Vice President Spiro Agnew were among those who attended his funeral, and President Richard Nixon issued a statement of condolence.

Family and legacy

Ellington married Catherine Ann Cheek in 1929.  They had two children: John, who became a pilot and aviation expert, and Ann, who became an artist.

The Ellington Agricultural Center, the headquarters of the Tennessee Department of Agriculture, is named in honor of Governor Ellington. 
A golf course at Henry Horton State Park and buildings on the campuses of Tennessee Technological University, the University of Memphis, and the University of Tennessee at Martin were also named in his honor.
The Financial Aid and Registrar building on the campus of Austin Peay State University is named in Ellington’s honor.

See also
List of governors of Tennessee

References

External links
Governor Buford Ellington Papers (finding aid) – Tennessee State Library and Archives
Buford Ellington Papers – Middle Tennessee State University 
Finding Aid for the Buford Ellington Papers - University of Tennessee Knoxville Libraries 
Portrait painting of Governor Ellington – Tennessee Portrait Project
Photographic portrait of Governor Ellington – Tennessee State Library and Archives

|-

|-

|-

|-

|-

20th-century American politicians
1907 births
1972 deaths
Democratic Party governors of Tennessee
Tennessee Commissioners of Agriculture
People from Holmes County, Mississippi
People from Marshall County, Tennessee